The Life Home is the debut album of Swedish artist Birgit Bidder, released in Sweden in March 2011.

The album is written and arranged by Birgit Bidder, produced by Jari Haapalainen, recorded in Aerosol Grey Machine and engineered by Christoffer Lundqvist. Three singles were released in Sweden through Birgit Bidder's own label Kerstin Records: "Parking Lot Paradise" in February 2010, "The Life Home" in August 2010, and "Coming Down" in March 2011.

Song list
 The Life Home
 Parking Lot Paradise
 Motel Sun
 Freeze For The Night
 The Sad End
 I'm Sorry It Took So Long
 Coming Down
 Silverblind
 Let Love Drown
 Weather Waltz
 Psalm From A Heart

Musicians
Birgit Bidder - Vocals, Piano, Hammond Organ, Rhodes, Clavinet, Celesta, Synths & Electric Guitars
Paulina Mellkvist & Jakob Erixson - Electric & Acoustic Guitars
Hanna Persson, Caroline Ekström, Per-Alexander Esbjörnsson & Kajsa Pehrsson - Backing Vocals
Magic Gunnarsson - Saxophone & Bass Clarinet
Svante Halldin - Trumpet & Flugel Horn
Micke Augustsson - Bandoneon & Accordion
Christoffer Lundquist - Lap Steel
Carl Greder - Bass Guitar
Martin Ödlund - Drums, Percussion, Mallet Percussion, Pump Organ & Saw

References
birgitbidder.com

2011 debut albums